Sugar cream pie (also known as sugar pie or Hoosier pie) is a custard pie made with a simple filling of butter, flour, cream and sugar sprinkled with cinnamon sugar. It is considered one of the desperation pies because the custard filling is made without eggs. The dessert may also be called finger pie in reference to the filling being stirred by the cook's finger before baking, as doing so avoids breaking the crust. It is similar to chess pie.

History
Sugar cream pie is the unofficial state pie of Indiana, where it is believed to have originated with Quaker settlers who came from North Carolina in the early 19th century, and thereafter settled in east-central Indiana, particularly around the cities of New Castle, Portland, Richmond, and Winchester.

The Amish also popularized sugar cream pie, making the pie easy to find where they populated. In particular, the pie is a favorite in the Pennsylvania Dutch areas, much as is shoofly pie, a similar dessert. Shakers also have a variant of the pie.  However, as the Shakers had to abandon their community of West Union (Busro) (near modern-day Vincennes, Indiana) in 1827, their only presence in Indiana ever (1810–1827), it is unlikely that they made the dessert popular in the state.

The largest producer of these pies is Wick's Pies, whose plant is in Winchester, Indiana, and makes 750,000 sugar cream pies a year. They are recognizable for their nutmeg dusting and shallow depth in a disposable aluminum pan.  The recipe Wick's uses came directly from a family recipe originating from the nineteenth century.  The pies sell in 25 states.

References

Notes

See also

List of Indiana state symbols
 American cuisine
 Traditional food
 Pie dough

External links
Retro Recipe Challenge #9: Québec's traditional sugar pie recipe
Maysville's Historic Transparent Pie

Symbols of Indiana
Indiana culture
Canadian desserts
Sweet pies
Cuisine of the Midwestern United States
American pies